AJ and the Queen is an American comedy-drama series, created by RuPaul and Michael Patrick King. It premiered on Netflix on January 10, 2020.

Premise
AJ and the Queen follows "Ruby Red, a bigger-than-life but down-on-her-luck drag queen who travels across America from club to club in a rundown 1986 R/V with her unlikely sidekick AJ, a recently orphaned, tough-talking, scrappy ten-year-old stowaway. As the two misfits travel from city to city, Ruby's message of love and acceptance winds up touching people and changing their lives for the better."

Cast and characters

Main
 RuPaul Charles as Robert Lincoln Lee/Ruby Red
 Izzy G. as Amber Jasmine "AJ" Douglas
 Michael-Leon Wooley as Louis Bell/Cocoa Butter
 Josh Segarra as Hector Ramirez/Damien Sanchez
 Katerina Tannenbaum as Brianna Douglas, AJ's mother
 Tia Carrere as Leilani Kala'i/Lady Danger

Recurring
 Matthew Wilkas as Officer Patrick Kennedy

Guest
 Victoria "Porkchop" Parker as Himself
 Jinkx Monsoon as Edie
 Katya Zamolodchikova as Magda
 Mario Cantone as Alma Joy
 Marc Singer as Bob
 Adrienne Barbeau as Helen
 Michael Cyril Creighton as Christian
 Chad Michaels as Brian Gerrity
 Tim Bagley as Lloyd Johnson
 Laura Bell Bundy as Bernadette Anderson
 Bridget Everett as Anna
 Natasha Leggero as Kath
 Jimmy Ray Bennett as Kevin
 Latrice Royale as Fabergé Legs
 Monique Heart as Miss Terri Tory
 Kevin Daniels as Darrell
 John Rubinstein as Doctor
 Mary Kay Place as Carolanne
 Jane Krakowski as Beth Barnes Beagle
 Ginger Minj as Tommy/Fanny Pack
 Trinity The Tuck as Danielle Dupri
 Jujubee as Lee Saint Lee
 Patrick Bristow as Kevin Prescott
 Lorraine Bracco as herself

Additionally, former RuPaul's Drag Race contestants Mayhem Miller, Valentina, Eureka O'Hara, Bianca Del Rio, Alexis Mateo, Manila Luzon, Vanessa Vanjie Mateo, Jaymes Mansfield, Ongina, Kennedy Davenport, Mariah Balenciaga, Dahlia Sin, Jade Jolie, Morgan McMichaels and Pandora Boxx make cameos, appearing as unnamed queens.

Production
In May 2018, it was announced that Netflix had given the production a series order for a first season consisting of ten episodes, with RuPaul starring. The series is created, written, and executive produced by RuPaul and Michael Patrick King. MPK Productions and Warner Bros. Television are involved in producing the series. In July 2018, a casting breakdown released to talent agencies was published online. It revealed the names of four new characters, Louis, Hector/Damian Sanchez, Lady Danger, and Brianna, and included character descriptions as well.

In September 2018, it was announced that Josh Segarra, Michael-Leon Wooley, Katerina Tannenbaum, and Tia Carrere had been cast in starring roles. On October 16, 2018, it was reported that Izzy G. had been cast in the lead role of the titular AJ. In January 2019, it was announced that Matthew Wilkas had joined the cast in a recurring capacity.

On March 6, 2020, Netflix announced that the series had been cancelled after one season.

Episodes

{{Episode table |background=#D583D7 |overall= |title= |director= |writer= |airdate= |airdateR= |released=y |country=U.S. |episodes=

{{Episode list
 |EpisodeNumber   = 6
 |Title           = Little Rock
 |DirectedBy      = Adam Shankman
 |WrittenBy       = Stephen Soroka
 |OriginalAirDate = 
 |ShortSummary    = AJ And Ruby pull into a Little Rock, Arkansas parking campsite for RVers for a few days' stay, one of the nearby neighbors has a near-identical RV which Ruby mistakenly enters after using the shower. The next day AJ gets busy digging for diamonds in a "diamond" field, while Ruby is befriended by three campsite regulars who want help putting on an informal show of Grease songs. Meanwhile, Damien and Lady Danger tracked down Ruby and try to kill her by planting a rattlesnake in the RV, which she escapes. On show day, Ruby plans to surprise the campsite regulars with AJ (as Grease'''s Sandy), and her counterpart Brick, a neighbor boy, dressed as Danny, to jump into the "Born to Hand Jive"/"You're the One That I Want" performance. But Brick had the idea to switch roles with AJ, upsetting his dad at the cross-dressing. 
 |LineColor       = D583D7
}}

}}

 Soundtrack 

On January 24, 2020 a 16 track soundtrack album titled AJ and the Queen (Official Television Soundtrack) was released by Warner Bros. Entertainment. It was created by Lior Rosner and RuPaul.

Reception
On Rotten Tomatoes, the series holds an approval rating of 52% based on 21 reviews, with an average rating of 5.39/10. The site's critical consensus reads: "Though it doesn't always come together, AJ and the Queen'' is a sweet, sometimes off-the wall adventure that's fun to watch even when it's fumbling." On Metacritic, the series has a weighted average score of 46 out of 100, based on 8 critics, indicating "mixed or average reviews".

References

External links

2020s American LGBT-related comedy television series
2020s American LGBT-related drama television series
2020 American television series debuts
2020 American television series endings
English-language Netflix original programming
Gay-related television shows
Works by RuPaul
Television series created by Michael Patrick King
Television series by Warner Bros. Television Studios
Drag (clothing) television shows